In general, a rural area or a countryside is a geographic area that is located outside towns and cities. Typical rural areas have a low population density and small settlements. Agricultural areas and areas with forestry typically are described as rural. Different countries have varying definitions of rural for statistical and administrative purposes.

In rural areas, because of their unique economic and social dynamics, and relationship to land-based industry such as agriculture, forestry and resource extraction, the economics are very different from cities and can be subject to boom and bust cycles and vulnerability to extreme weather or natural disasters, such as droughts. These dynamics alongside larger economic forces encouraging to urbanization have led to significant demographic declines, called rural flight, where economic incentives encourage younger populations to go to cities for education and access to jobs, leaving older, less educated and less wealthy populations in the rural areas. Slower economic development results in poorer services like healthcare and education and rural infrastructure. This cycle of poverty in some rural areas, means that three quarters of the global population in poverty live in rural areas according to the Food and Agricultural Organization.

Some communities have successfully encouraged economic development in rural areas, with some policies such as giving increased access to electricity or internet, proving very successful on encouraging economic activities in rural areas. Historically development policies have focused on larger extractive industries, such as mining and forestry. However, recent approaches more focused on sustainable development are more aware of economic diversification in these communities.

Regional definitions

North America

Canada
In Canada, the Organization for Economic Co-operation and Development defines a "predominantly rural region" as having more than 50% of the population living in rural communities where a "rural community" has a population density less than 150 people per square kilometer. In Canada, the census division has been used to represent "regions" and census consolidated sub-divisions have been used to represent "communities". Intermediate regions have 15 to 49 percent of their population living in a rural community. Predominantly urban regions have less than 15 percent of their population living in a rural community. Predominantly rural regions are classified as rural metro-adjacent, rural non-metro-adjacent and rural northern, following Philip Ehrensaft and Jennifer Beeman (1992). Rural metro-adjacent regions are predominantly rural census divisions which are adjacent to metropolitan centers while rural non-metro-adjacent regions are those predominantly rural census divisions which are not adjacent to metropolitan centers. Rural northern regions are predominantly rural census divisions that are found either entirely or mostly above the following lines of latitude in each province: Newfoundland and Labrador, 50th; Manitoba, 53rd; Alberta, British Columbia, Ontario, Quebec, and Saskatchewan, 54th. As well, rural northern regions encompass all of the Yukon, Northwest Territories and Nunavut.

Statistics Canada defines rural areas by their population counts. This definition has changed over time (see Appendix A in du Plessis et al., 2002). Typically, it has referred to the population living outside settlements of 1,000 or fewer inhabitants. The current definition states that census rural is the population outside settlements with fewer than 1,000 inhabitants and a population density below 400 people per square kilometer (Statistics Canada, 2007).

United States

South America

Brazil
In Brazil, there are different notions of "rural area" and "countryside". Rural areas are any place outside a municipality's urban development (buildings, streets) and it is carried by informal usage. Otherwise, countryside (interior in Portuguese) are officially defined as all municipalities outside the state/territory capital's metropolitan region. Some states as Mato Grosso do Sul do not have any metropolitan regions, thus all of the state, except its capital is officially countryside. Rio de Janeiro is singular in Brazil and it is de facto a metropolitan state, as circa 70% of its population are located in Greater Rio. In the Federal District it is not applicable and there is no countryside as all of it is treated as the federal capital. Brasília is nominally the capital, but the capitality is shared through all Federal District, because Brazil de facto defines its capital as a municipality, and in municipal matters, the Federal District is treated and governs as a single municipality, city-state-like (Brasília, DF).

Europe

France
15% of French population live in rural areas, spread over 90% of the country. President Emmanuel Macron government launched an action plan in 2019 in favour for rural areas named "Agenda Rural". Among many initiatives recommended to redynamize rural areas, energy transition is one of them. Research is being carried out to assess the impact of new projects in rural areas.

Germany
Germany is divided into 402 administrative districts, 295 rural districts and 107 urban districts. As one of the largest agricultural producers in the European Union, more than half of Germany's territory which is almost 19 million hectares, is used for farming, and located in the rural areas. Almost 10% of people in Germany have jobs related to the agricultural, forest and fisheries sectors; approximately a fifth of them are employed in the primary production. Since there is a policy of equal living conditions, people see rural areas as equivalent as urban areas. Village renewal is an approach to develop countryside and supports the challenges faced in the process of it.

United Kingdom

In Britain, "rural" is defined by the government Department for Environment, Food and Rural Affairs (DEFRA), using population data from the latest census, such as the United Kingdom Census 2001. These definitions have various grades, but the upper point is any local government area with more than 26% of its population living in a rural settlement or market town ("market town" being defined as any settlement which has permission to hold a street market). A number of measures are in place to protect the British countryside, including green belts.

Asia

China

In mainland China, rural areas sometimes use different lower-level administrative divisions than urban areas, such as counties and townships instead of districts and subdistricts.

India

Rural areas are also known as the 'countryside' or a 'village' in India. It has a very low population density. In rural areas, agriculture is the chief source of livelihood along with fishing, cottage industries, pottery etc.

Almost every Indian economic agency today has its own definition of rural India, some of which follow:
According to the Planning Commission, a town with a maximum population of 15,000 is considered rural in nature. In these areas the panchayat makes all the decisions. There are five people in the panchayat.
The National Sample Survey Organization (NSSO) defines ‘rural’ as follows:
 An area with a population density of up to 400 per square kilometer,
 Villages with clear surveyed boundaries but no municipal board,
 A minimum of 75% of male working population involved in agriculture and allied activities.
RBI defines rural areas as those areas with a population of less than 49,000 (tier -3 to tier-6 cities).

It is generally said that the rural areas house up to 70% of India's population. Rural India contributes a large chunk to India's GDP by way of agriculture, self-employment, services, construction etc. As per a strict measure used by the National Sample Survey in its 63rd round, called monthly per capita expenditure, rural expenditure accounts for 55% of total national monthly expenditure. The rural population currently accounts for one-third of the total Indian FMCG sales.

Japan
In Japan, rural areas are referred to as "Inaka" which translates literally to "the countryside" or "one's native village".

Pakistan

According to the 2017 census about 64% of Pakistanis live in rural areas. Most rural areas in Pakistan tend to be near cities and are peri-urban areas. This is due to the definition of a rural area in Pakistan being an area that does not come within an urban boundary. Rural areas in Pakistan that are near cities are considered as suburban areas or suburbs. 

The remote rural villagers of Pakistan commonly live in houses made of bricks, clay or mud. Socioeconomic status among rural Pakistani villagers is often based upon the ownership of agricultural land, which also may provide social prestige in village cultures. The majority of rural Pakistani inhabitants livelihoods is based upon the rearing of livestock, which also comprises a significant part of Pakistan's gross domestic product. Some livestock raised by rural Pakistanis include cattle and goats.

Oceania

New Zealand
In New Zealand census areas are classified based on their degree of rurality. However, traffic law has a different interpretation and defines a Rural area as "... a road or a geographical area that is not an urban traffic area, to which the rural speed limit generally applies."

Economics

Development

Electricity

Migration

Poverty

Rural health

Human fertility

Rural residence is a fertility factor, with total fertility rates and pregnancy being higher among women in rural areas than among women in urban areas and the rural population is much younger than urban areas.

Academic study 
Because of their unique dynamics, different academic fields have developed to study rural communities.

Economics

Rural planning 
Rural planning is an academic discipline that exists within or alongside the field of urban planning, regional planning or urbanism. The definition of these fields differs between languages and contexts. Sometimes the terms are used interchangeably.

Sociology

See also

American Old West
Boondocks
Bushland
Country house
Developed areas
Digital divide
Landed gentry
Nature
Outback
Peasantry
Rural Community Council
Rural crafts
Rural ghetto
Rural Internet
Urban decay
Wilderness

References

Further reading

  Thomas C. Ricketts, Karen D. Johnson-Webb, Patricia Taylor. Chapel Hill: North Carolina Rural Health Research Program, Cecil G. Sheps Center for Health Services Research, University of North Carolina, 1998. 13 p.

External links

Census 2000 Urban and Rural Classification
North West Rural Affairs Forum (England)
Canadian Rural Partnership
The Better India- Rural India
India Rural Population

City
Ecology
Human habitats
Rural society
Rural culture
Rural economics
Rural geography
Settlement geography